Wilber G. Smith (March 21, 1935 – July 31, 1992) was an American civil rights activist politician who served in the Connecticut Senate as a member of the Democratic Party.

Early life

Wilber G. Smith was born on March 21, 1935. During his childhood he attended segregated schools in Orlando, Florida, and later attended Weaver High School. He graduated from the Eastern Connecticut State University and the University of Connecticut School of Law.

Career

In 1969, he ran unsuccessfully for mayor of Hartford as an independent. In 1970, he was elected to the Connecticut Senate and served until 1977, when he moved to New York to run the national NAACP prison program. A slander lawsuit was filed against him in 1979, after he accused assistant city manager Michael F. Brown of sympathizing with the Ku Klux Klan. He returned to the Senate in 1980, and served until he was defeated by Frank Barrows in 1984. In 1990, he ran against Barrows, but was defeated.

Death

On July 31, 1992, Smith died from cancer in Newington, Connecticut.

References

External links

1935 births
1992 deaths
20th-century American politicians
Democratic Party Connecticut state senators